Yoʼnal Ahk may refer to:
Kʼinich Yoʼnal Ahk I
Kʼinich Yoʼnal Ahk II
Yoʼnal Ahk III, king of the Mayan city Piedras Negras, who ruled AD 758-767